William Britton may refer to:

William B. Britton (1829–1910), American politician
W. H. Britton (William Hamilton Britton, 1892–1982), American football and basketball coach
Bill Britton (born 1955), American golfer
Bill Britton (Canadian football) (1934–2017), Canadian football player
Bill Britton (athlete) (1890–1965), Irish athlete

See also
William Britton Baird
William Britain (disambiguation)
William Breton (disambiguation)